Micromyinae is a subfamily of wood midges, insects in the family Cecidomyiidae. Its members were formerly included in subfamily Lestremiinae. There are at least 55 genera and more than 650 described species in Micromyinae. All species in this subfamily are mycophageous.

Genera
These genera belong to the subfamily Micromyinae:

 Tribe Acoenoniini
 Acoenonia Pritchard, 1947 i c g
 †Proacoenonia Nel & Prokop, 2006 Oise amber, France, Ypresian
 Tribe Aprionini
 Aprionus Kieffer, 1894 c g
†Corporesana Fedotova and Perkovsky 2016 Taimyr amber, Russia, Santonian
†Cretomycophila Fedotova and Perkovsky 2016 Taimyr amber, Russia, Santonian
 Mycophila Felt, 1911
 Tekomyia Mohn, 1960 c g
 Tropaprionus Jaschhof & Jaschhof 2011
 Yukawamyia Mamaev & Zaitzev, 1996 c g
 Tribe Bryomyiini
 Bryomyia Kieffer, 1895 i c g
 Heterogenella Mamaev, 1963 c g
 Skuhraviana Mamaev, 1963 c g
 Tribe Campylomyzini
 Ansifera Jaschhof, 2009
 Campylomyza Meigen, 1818 i c g
 Corinthomyia Felt, 1911 i c g
†Cretocordylomyia Gagne, 1977 Canadian amber, Campanian
Excrescentia Mamaev & Berest, 1991 c g
Hintelmannomyia Jaschhof, 2010
Micropteromyia Mamaev, 1960 c g
Neurolyga Rondani, 1840 c g
Warramyia Jaschhof, 2010
Tribe Catochini
Anocha Pritchard, 1948
†Caputmunda Fedotova and Perkovsky 2016 Taimyr amber, Russia, Santonian
 Catarete Edwards, 1929 c g
 Catocha Haliday, 1833 i c g b
†Cretocatocha Gagné 1977 Canadian amber, Campanian
 Forbesomyia Malloch, 1914 i c g
Neocatocha Felt, 1912 i c g
 Tritozyga Loew, 1862 i c g
 Tribe Micromyini
 Anodontoceras Yukawa, 1967 c g
 Antennardia
 Ladopyris
†Menssana Fedotova and Perkovsky 2016 Taimyr amber, Russia, Santonian
Micromya Rondani, 1840 i c g
Monardia Kieffer, 1895 i c g b
Polyardis Pritchard, 1947 i c g
Pseudoperomyia Jaschhof & Hippa, 1999 c g
 Tribe Peromyiini
†Cretoperomyia Fedotova and Perkovsky 2016 Taimyr amber, Russia, Santonian
Gagnea Jaschhof, 2001 c g
Peromyia Kieffer, 1894 i c g b
 Tribe Pteridomyiini
Pseudomonardia Jaschhof, 2003 c g
 Pteridomyia Jaschhof, 2003 c g
 Tribe Strobliellini
Amedia Jaschhof, 1997 c g b
 Amediella Jaschhof, 2003 c g
 †Eltxo Arillo & Nel, 2000 Spanish amber , Albian c g
 Groveriella Mamaev, 1978 c g
†Palaeostrobliella Fedotova and Perkovsky 2016 Taimyr amber, Russia, Santonian
 Strobliella Kieffer, 1898 i c g
†Yantardakhiella Fedotova and Perkovsky 2016 Taimyr amber, Russia, Santonian
†Zherikhiniella Fedotova and Perkovsky 2016 Taimyr amber, Russia, Santonian
 Incertae sedis
 †Berestella Fedotova & Perkovsky, 2007
 Ipomyia Colless, 1965 c g
 Psadaria Enderlein, 1940 c g
 Termitomastus Silvestri, 1901 c g
 †Vicemyia Fedotova & Perkovsky, 2007 Rovno amber , Ukraine, Eocene
Nomina dubia
Calospatha Kieffer, 1913 c g
Stenospatha Kieffer, 1913 c g
Tricampylomyza Kieffer, 1919 c g
Trichelospatha Kieffer, 1913 c g
Tricolpodia Kieffer, 1913

Data sources: i = ITIS, c = Catalogue of Life, g = GBIF, b = Bugguide.net

References

Further reading

External links

 

Cecidomyiidae
Nematocera subfamilies